The Somaliland Football Association (SFA) is the governing body of football in Somaliland. 
The association was established in 2011
The current Chairman and General Secretary is Mohamed Abdi Dixood  and Samatar Mohamed Abdillahi respectively.

See also
 Somaliland national football team
 Ministry of Youth and Sports (Somaliland)
 Hargeisa Stadium
 Alamzey Stadium

References

Association football governing bodies in Africa
Government agencies of Somaliland
Football in Africa not associated with FIFA